Jill P. Mesirov is an American mathematician, computer scientist, and computational biologist who is the Associate Vice Chancellor for Computational Health Sciences at the University of California, San Diego. She previously held an adjunct faculty position at Boston University and was the associate director and chief informatics officer at the Eli and Edythe L. Broad Institute of MIT and Harvard.

Education
Mesirov did her undergraduate studies at the University of Pennsylvania, and earned a doctorate in mathematics from Brandeis University in 1974, under the supervision of Richard Palais.

Research and career
Her research concerns high-performance computing. Effective July 1, 2015, she has been appointed Associate Vice Chancellor for Computational Health Sciences and Professor of Medicine at the University of California, San Diego School of Medicine and Moores Cancer Center.

She has worked at the University of California, Berkeley, the American Mathematical Society, Thinking Machines Corporation, and IBM before joining the Whitehead Institute of MIT in 1997, which eventually became part of the Broad Institute. She was president of the Association for Women in Mathematics from 1989 to 1991. She served on the Board of Trustees for the Institute for Computational and Experimental Research in Mathematics (ICERM) from 2017 to 2021.

Awards and honors
Mesirov became a fellow of the American Association for the Advancement of Science in 1996. In 2012, she was elected an ISCB Fellow by the International Society for Computational Biology in 2012, and one of the inaugural fellows of the American Mathematical Society. In 2017, she was selected as a fellow of the Association for Women in Mathematics in the inaugural class.

Publications 
 (co-ed.) Mathematical Approaches to Biomolecular Structure and Dynamics. The IMA Volumes in Mathematics and its Applications, avec Klaus Schulten et De Witt Sumners, Springer, 254p. 
 (coll.) Research in Computational Molecular Biology, 9th Annual International Conference, RECOMB 2005, Cambridge, MA, USA, May 14–18, 2005, Proceedings (Lecture Notes in Computer Science), Springer,  632p. 
 Very Large Scale Computing in the 21st Century, Society for Industrial & Applied Mathematics, 1991, 345p.

References

Year of birth missing (living people)
Living people
20th-century American mathematicians
21st-century American mathematicians
American computer scientists
American women mathematicians
American women computer scientists
University of Pennsylvania alumni
Brandeis University alumni
Fellows of the American Association for the Advancement of Science
Fellows of the American Mathematical Society
Fellows of the International Society for Computational Biology
Fellows of the Association for Women in Mathematics
20th-century women mathematicians
21st-century women mathematicians
21st-century American women